Daniel Gallemore (born June 14, 1985) is an American professional mixed martial artist and boxer. A professional competitor since 2011, Gallemore has formerly competed for the Professional Fighters League, Titan FC, and Bellator MMA.

Background
Born and raised Eskridge, Kansas, Gallemore attended Mission Valley High School, and competed in wrestling and football. Gallemore began training in MMA after graduating high school to maintain and stay in shape.

Mixed martial arts career

Early career
Gallemore compiled an amateur record of 12-3 and won the ISCF Amateur Championship before turning professional in 2011.

Gallemore faced undefeated Augusto Sakai at Bellator 139 on June 26, 2015.

Gallemore was scheduled to rematch Fredrick Brown on Bellator 150 on February 26, 2016, but Brown had to back out of the fight due to injury.

Professional Fighters League
Gallemore is scheduled to make his Professional Fighters League debut on November 2, 2017, in a heavyweight fight against Mike Kyle at PFL: Fight Night in Washington D.C.

Boxing career
Gallemore is also an undefeated professional boxer with a record of 5-0-0, with two wins coming by way of knockout.

Mixed martial arts record

|-
|Loss
|align=center|7–6
|Valdrin Istrefi
|TKO (leg kicks)
|PFL 4
|
|align=center|2
|align=center|1:42
|Uniondale, New York, United States
|
|-
|Loss
|align=center| 7–5
|Francimar Barroso
|TKO (doctor stoppage)
|PFL 1
|
|align=center|1
|align=center|3:57
|New York, New York, United States
|
|-
|Loss
|align=center| 7–4
|Mike Kyle
|TKO (knees)
|PFL: Fight Night
|
|align=center|1
|align=center|1:01
|Washington, D.C., United States
|
|-
|Win
|align=center| 7–3
|Daniel James
|Submission (guillotine choke)
|Victory Fighting Championship 57
|
|align=center|1
|align=center|1:24
|Topeka, Kansas, United States
|Defended the Victory FC Heavyweight Championship.
|-
|Win
|align=center| 6–3
|Derek Bohi
|TKO (punches)
|Victory Fighting Championship 55: Lindsey vs. Cochrane 2
|
|align=center|1
|align=center|1:34
|Topeka, Kansas, United States
|Defended the Victory FC Heavyweight Championship.
|-
|Win
|align=center| 5–3
|Abe Wagner
|Submission (guillotine choke)
|Victory Fighting Championship 50
|
|align=center|1
|align=center|1:37
|Topeka, Kansas, United States
|Won the Victory FC Heavyweight Championship.
|-
|Loss
|align=center| 4–3
|Augusto Sakai
|TKO (retirement)
|Bellator 139
|
|align=center|2
|align=center|5:00
|Mulvane, Kansas, United States
|
|-
|Win
|align=center| 4–2
|Gzim Selmani
|TKO (punches)
|Bellator 130
|
|align=center|2
|align=center|4:33
|Mulvane, Kansas, United States
|
|-
| Win
| align=center| 3–2
| Frederick Brown
| TKO (elbows and punches)
| Bellator 113
| 
| align=center| 1
| align=center| 3:34
| Mulvane, Kansas, United States
| 
|-
| Win
| align=center| 2–2
| Benji Norris
| KO
| Danger-Fire Promotions: Season's Beatings
| 
| align=center| 1
| align=center| 0:20
| Topeka, Kansas, United States
| 
|-
| Loss
| align=center| 1–2
| Rowland Bruce Redenbaugh
| TKO (punches)
| UFF 11
| 
| align=center| 2
| align=center| 4:07
| Wichita, Kansas, United States
| 
|-
| Win
| align=center| 1–1
| Derrick Ruffin
| TKO (retirement)
| Bellator 56
| 
| align=center| 2
| align=center| 5:00
| Kansas City, Kansas, United States
| 
|-
| Loss
| align=center| 0–1
| Alex Huddleston
| Decision (unanimous)
| Titan FC 19
| 
| align=center| 3
| align=center| 5:00
| Kansas City, Kansas, United States
|

References

4. "Daniel 'Big Kansas' Gallemore Returns to the Cage for Bellator 150" mymmanews.com

Living people
1985 births
American male mixed martial artists
Heavyweight mixed martial artists
Mixed martial artists utilizing jujutsu
American jujutsuka